Carrozza is an Italian surname. Notable people with the surname include:

 Alessandro Carrozza (born 1982), Italian footballer
 Ann-Margaret Carrozza (born 1966), American lawyer and politician
 Carmen Carrozza (1921–2013), American classical accordionist
 Coby Carrozza (born 2001), American swimmer
 Giacomo Antonio Carrozza (died 1560), Italian Roman Catholic prelate
 Luigi Carrozza (born 1969), Swiss baseball player
 Maria Chiara Carrozza (born 1965), Italian engineer and politician
 Robert F. Carrozza (born 1940), Italian-American mobster

See also
 Carozza, surname
 Carrozza (sandwich)

Italian-language surnames